Zachary Merton Hospital is a health facility at Glenville Road, Rustington, West Sussex, England. It is managed by the Sussex Community NHS Foundation Trust.

History
The facility, which was financed by a trust fund established by Zachary Merton, was opened as a convalescent home in April 1937. It became a maternity hospital in 1939 and, after joining the National Health Service as the Zachary Merton Maternity Home in 1948, it became a community hospital in 1979.

References

External links 

 
 Inspection reports from the Care Quality Commission

Hospital buildings completed in 1937
1937 establishments in England
Hospitals established in 1937
Hospitals in West Sussex
NHS hospitals in England
Littlehampton